Ratsada 24 Oras, formerly Ratsada and 24 Oras Western Visayas is a Philippine television newscast by GMA Iloilo. Originally anchored by Noly Calvo and Jeja Rose Pernan, it premiered on October 4, 1999. The newscast concluded on November 13, 2015, with  Gerthrode Charlotte Tan and Atty.  Jobert Peñaflorida served as the final anchors.

Overview
It provides news and features around Iloilo City and Province of the same name and the rest of Western Visayas. The newscast airs every Monday to Friday 5:00 to 5:45 pm with its broadcast center located at MacArthur Drive, Jaro, Iloilo City. It is also heard on a slightly delayed basis through DYSI 1323 AM and simulcast over GMA Channel 2 Kalibo and GMA Channel 5 Roxas live. The newscast's anchors are Gerthrode Charlotte Tan and Atty. Jobert Peñaflorida (a former news anchor of TV Patrol Panay on ABS-CBN Iloilo). Ratsada 24 Oras has covered the entire Western Visayas and has increased its ability to provide comprehensive, effective and reliable news gathering.

History
The newscast began its airing on October 4, 1999. It was one of the three regional newscasts initially launched by the network along with Balitang Bisdak of GMA Cebu and Testigo of GMA Davao (now One Mindanao) under the banner of GMA Super Balita. Jeja Rose Pornan-Simeon and Noly Calvo were the first anchors of the said news program. Noly Calvo eventually became the sole anchor.

In 2002, Calvo and Pornan-Simeon was replaced by Gerthrode Charlotte Tan and Christopher Misajon, who was known as "Mr. Ratsada". The tandem of Tan and Misajon lasted until September 23, 2004, when Misajon was shot by a group of robbers and died two days later.

Misajon was replaced by Jonathan Gellangarin, who is a well-known radio personality in Western Visayas.

In October 2007, Ratsada began its simulcast on GMA Bacolod. The simulcast lasted until November 19, 2010, in preparation with the launch of its own regional news program Isyu Subong Negrense; and later returned in November 2012 until 2013 airing the two programs back-to-back.

On the newscast's 10th anniversary in 2009, Tan temporarily left the newscast leaving Gellangarin as the main anchor of the program until sometime between 2011 and 2012.

In 2012, Gellangarin left the newscast and was replaced by Mark Nunieza joining Tan as her co-anchor.

Following changes of 24 Oras (its now-main newscast), Ratsada was rebranded as 24 Oras Western Visayas on November 10, 2014. Lawyer and local broadcast journalist Atty. Jobert Peñaflorida took Nunieza's place who returned to his reportorial job to the newscast.

On July 20, 2015, 24 Oras Western Visayas was retitled Ratsada 24 Oras similar to Luzon version.

After more than 16 years (with Ratsada and 24 Oras Western Visayas' history inclusion), Ratsada 24 Oras went off-air on November 13, 2015, following the layoffs of more than 20 personnel in the Iloilo station (reporters, cameramen, technical personnel) as part of streamlining of operations reverted to GMA programs (since April opposite 24 Oras Ilokano of GMA Ilocos, 24 Oras Bikol of GMA Bicol, Isyu Subong Negrense of GMA Bacolod and 24 Oras Northern Mindanao of GMA Northern Mindanao for having their final broadcast).

Almost three years after Ratsada was cancelled, GMA Iloilo returned as an originating station with the launching of the new newscast One Western Visayas. Correspondent Joecel Huesca joined the newscast as its executive producer and correspondent.

Area of coverage
Kalibo and Aklan
San Jose de Buenavista and Antique
Roxas City and Capiz
Iloilo City and Iloilo
Jordan and Guimaras

Final segments
 Tsapa Reports (carried over to One Western Visayas)
 Kapuso Barangayan (carried over to One Western Visayas)
 I M Ready
 Side Line
 Ratsada MoJo (portmanteau for Mobile Journalist)

Final reporters
 Enrico Surita Jr. (now with DYSI)
 Joecel Huesca (carried over to One Western Visayas)
 Charlene Belvis Gador
 Julius Belaca-Ol (now executive producer of GMA Regional TV Early Edition and a Senior Desk Manager of One Western Visayas)
 Nenita Hobilla

Final anchors
 Gerthrode Charlotte Tan-Mabilog
 Atty. Jobert Peñaflorida (formerly from ABS-CBN TV-10 Iloilo)

Former reporters and anchors
Jeja Rose Pornan
Noly Calvo
Chris Misajon†
Alvin Dennis Arabang
Jonathan Gellangarin (now with DYSI)
Mark Nunieza (now with 774 RMN Iloilo)
Fabienne Paderes
Alessa Quimsing (now with 88.7 Radyo Bandera Sweet FM Iloilo)
Carol Velagio
Jason Gregorio
Jowelie Docdocil
 Jennifer Munieza-Jumaquio
Mavic Tse Wing
Bernard Bernal
Samantha Jalandoni

External links

References

1999 Philippine television series debuts
2015 Philippine television series endings
GMA Network news shows
GMA Integrated News and Public Affairs shows
Philippine television news shows
Television in Iloilo City